Vadym Mykolayovych Solohub (born 11 March 2004) is a Ukrainian professional footballer who plays as a right winger for Ukrainian First League club Hirnyk-Sport Horishni Plavni, on loan from Rukh Lviv.

References

External links
 
 

2004 births
Living people
Sportspeople from Vinnytsia Oblast
Ukrainian footballers
Association football forwards
FC Rukh Lviv players
FC Hirnyk-Sport Horishni Plavni players
Ukrainian First League players